Lord Cardross is a title in the Peerage of Scotland, since 1695 a subsidiary title of the earldom of Buchan. It was created in 1606 for John Erskine, Earl of Mar, with remainder to his heirs male and assignees whatsoever and with the power to nominate his successor. In 1617 he nominated his second son by his second wife Marie Stewart, Henry Erskine, Master of Cardross, to be his successor in the lordship of Cardross. The Earl of Mar died in 1634 and was succeeded in the earldom of Mar by his son by his first wife, John, and in the lordship of Cardross by his grandson David Erskine, the second Lord Cardross, the son of Henry, Master of Cardross, who had died in 1628. The second Lord was a supporter of The Engagement and was barred from sitting in Parliament in 1649. He was succeeded by his eldest son, the third Lord. He emigrated to North America to escape religious persecution and established a colony in what is now Carolina. His son, the fourth Lord, succeeded his kinsman in the earldom of Buchan in 1695. However, it was not until 1698 that his claim was established by the Scottish Parliament. For further history of the title, see Earl of Buchan.

Several other members of this branch of the Erskine family have also gained distinction. John Erskine of Cardross, younger son of the second Lord, was a soldier and politician. John Erskine of Carnock, son of John Erskine of Cardross, was a noted jurist. John Erskine, leader of the Evangelical Party in the 18th century Scottish Church, was the son of John Erskine of Carnock by his first wife. John Elphinstone Erskine, grandson of James Erskine, son of James Erskine of Carnock by his second wife, was an admiral in the Royal Navy. Sir David Erskine, son of James Erskine, brother of John Elphinstone Erskine, was Serjeant at Arms of the British House of Commons between 1885 and 1915 and held several positions at the British court. James Francis Erskine (1862–1936), eldest son of Sir David Erskine, was a brigadier-general in the Scots Guards. His son Malcolm David Erskine (1903–1949), was a brigadier in the Scots Guards. Seymour Elphinstone Erskine (1863–1945), second son of Sir David Erskine, was an admiral in the Royal Navy. Walter Hugh Erskine (1870–1948), third son of Sir David Erskine, was Deputy Serjeant at Arms of the British House of Commons between 1929 and 1940. Ian David Erskine (1898–1973), son of Alan David Erskine, fourth son of Sir David Erskine, was a major-general in the British Army. Sir Arthur Erskine, fifth son of Sir David Erskine, was a soldier and courtier. Sir James Elphinstone Erskine, brother of Sir David Erskine, was an admiral of the fleet. George Elphinstone Erskine (1841–1912), son of George Keith Erskine, brother of John Elphinstone Erskine, was a major-general in the Bombay Cavalry in the Indian Army. His son by his second wife, Sir George Erskine, was a general in the British Army.

Lords Cardross (1606)
John Erskine, Earl of Mar, 1st Lord Cardross (1562–1634) 
Henry Erskine, Master of Cardross (d. 1628)
David Erskine, 2nd Lord Cardross (1627–1671)
Henry Erskine, 3rd Lord Cardross ( 1650–1693)
David Erskine, 4th Lord Cardross (1672–1745) (succeeded as Earl of Buchan in 1695)

see Earl of Buchan for further succession

References

Lordships of Parliament
Cardross
Noble titles created in 1610
Peerages created with special remainders